is a Japanese football player.

Playing career
Suzuki was born in Saitama Prefecture on August 19, 2000. He joined J1 League club FC Tokyo from youth team in 2018.

References

External links

2000 births
Living people
Toin University of Yokohama alumni
Association football people from Saitama Prefecture
Japanese footballers
J1 League players
J3 League players
FC Tokyo players
FC Tokyo U-23 players
Toin University of Yokohama FC players
Association football defenders